Peter David Latham (born 8 January 1984) is a New Zealand former professional racing cyclist. He competed in the team pursuit at the 2004 Summer Olympics, where New Zealand finished tenth. In 2005 Latham won the bronze medal in the Under 23 Individual Time Trial at the Road World Championships in Madrid. He competed at the 2006 Commonwealth Games in Melbourne where along with Tim Gudsell, Hayden Godfrey and Marc Ryan he won a bronze medal in the Team pursuit.

Career
In 2005 Latham went to the UCI Road World Championships to compete in the Under-23 category. In the time trial Latham came third 37 seconds behind winner Mikhail Ignatiev. Later in November Latham rode the Lake Taupo Cycle Challenge winning the event in a sprint against Jeremy Yates and Gordon McCauley. After breaking his back in a crash in 2007, Latham came back to represent New Zealand at the 2008 Summer Olympics. At the 2009 UCI Track Cycling World Championships in Poland, Latham along with Marc Ryan, Jesse Sergent, and Westley Gough claimed the bronze medal in the team pursuit. The following year Latham was part of the New Zealand team pursuit that won bronze again at the 2010 UCI Track Cycling World Championships in Denmark.

At the 2011-2012 UCI Track Cycling World Cup Classics, Latham won the Individual Pursuit at the Beijing round. He was the overall World Cup series winner in the Individual Pursuit that season and finished the season ranked World Number One in the Individual pursuit by the Union Cycliste International.

Latham retired at the end of 2012. He currently works as a Fixed Income trader with the Bank of New Zealand.

Major results
Sources:

2003
 National Under-23 Road Championships
1st  Time trial
2nd Road race
2004
 National Under-23 Road Championships
1st  Time trial
1st  Road race
 1st Stage 1 (TTT) Tour of Wellington
 6th Overall Tour of Southland
1st Stage 5 (ITT)
2005
 1st Stage 1 (TTT) Tour of Southland
 1st Lake Taupo Cycle Challenge
 3rd Overall Tour of Wellington
1st Stages 2, 3 & 6 (ITT)
 3rd   Under-23 time trial UCI Road World Championships
2006
 3rd Chrono Champenois
 9th Overall Tour of Wellington
2007
 1st Stage 2 Kreiz Breizh Elites
2009
 5th Overall Tour of Southland

References

External links

Living people
1984 births
New Zealand male cyclists
New Zealand track cyclists
Commonwealth Games bronze medallists for New Zealand
Cyclists at the 2002 Commonwealth Games
Cyclists at the 2006 Commonwealth Games
Olympic cyclists of New Zealand
Cyclists at the 2004 Summer Olympics
Cyclists at the 2008 Summer Olympics
People from Te Awamutu
Cyclists at the 2010 Commonwealth Games
Commonwealth Games medallists in cycling
Sportspeople from Waikato
Medallists at the 2006 Commonwealth Games
People educated at Te Awamutu College